"Angels Fall" is a song by American rock band Breaking Benjamin. Released soon after the album's lead single "Failure" on April 14, 2015, the track is the second single on their fifth studio album Dark Before Dawn and is the album's third track overall.

Music
Loudwire writer Chad Childers said the song "has a more moody vibe in the verses until the power of Ben Burnley's voice adds a sense of urgency during the chorus, delivering a message about not giving up and not giving in to obstacles that may stand in your way." Benjamin Burnley said of the song after its release, "I don't want to reinvent the wheel. I just want to write good music that's gonna stand the test of time and I try to do that."

Music video
The music video starts with a shot of dark ominous storm clouds then quickly transitions to an old underwater shipwreck. Throughout the song, the band is shown playing on a beach near a bonfire. Other scenes include a sandy landscape with patches of scrubby grass under the ominous storm clouds where an older man is yelling at and struggling with a younger woman and a similar landscape with an older woman yelling at and struggling with a young boy. All four appear to be wearing early 19th-century clothing. Other shots include items on the shore as water ebbs over them (pocket watch, urn) and items underwater (Pegasus statue, ship's steering wheel, lifeboat). Shots above water show raging waves, dark clouds, and lightning.

The older man and young woman stop fighting when she notices that half of his face is covered in dark cracks. The two of them then notice the older woman and young boy, who have also stopped fighting, and the four slowly approach each other. Suddenly the older man clutches his chest and falls to the ground. The young boy kneels next to his body and as a tear falls cracks begin to appear on his face. The older man suddenly opens his eyes and looks at the young boy. The cracks on both of them disappear. The young woman embraces the young boy and the older woman embraces the older man. As they release each other they all look out towards the water and see a boat sinking in the distance. The sun rises brilliantly over the watery horizon and the scene quickly switches back to the four who appear to be obliterated in a wave of light. The band members are then seen smashing their instruments violently into the bonfire. As the song closes, the scene transitions again to the underwater shipwreck and then pans across to a large stone with a memorial plaque affixed to it, which implies the elderly couple, the young woman and the boy were the ghosts of the four people lost when the ship sank. Some of the words are obscured, but what can be seen reads:

S.S. Jane Bryan
Which sank off this coast
Four lives were lost 
A mother and son,
A husband and wife
Jim Gantley [unreadable] Monroe
Karen Gantley and Deborah Monroe

Release
On April 11, 2015, Breaking Benjamin released a 37-second sample of "Angels Fall", announcing its release. On April 14, it was released as a follow-up to the album's lead single "Failure". On September 14, 2015, a music video was released for the song.

Reception
"Angels Fall" was positively received by critics. Kristen Gaydos of The Citizens' Voice praised the "ominous introduction to the radio-friendly chorus". James Christopher Monger of AllMusic called the song one of the album's "standout cuts". Marcus Floyd of Renowned for Sound labeled the track as "both lyrically and sonically explosive with BB's trademark earthy sound". Nony Khondaker of The Daily Star commented on the catchy chorus, calling it the song's strongest part.

Credits and personnel
Credits adapted from the liner notes of Dark Before Dawn.

Performed by Breaking Benjamin
Written by Benjamin Burnley
Produced by Benjamin Burnley
Recorded by John Bender and Benjamin Burnley at St. Studios, Ocean City, and The Barbershop Studios, Lake Hopatcong, New Jersey
Audio engineering by John Bender, Dan Korneff, Jim Romano, and Benjamin Burnley
Mixed by Chris Lord-Alge, Keith Armstrong, and Nik Karpen at Mix L.A., Tarzana, Los Angeles
Mastered by Ted Jensen at Sterling Sound, New York City, New York

Charts

Weekly charts

Year-end charts

Certifications

References

2015 singles
2015 songs
Breaking Benjamin songs
Hollywood Records singles
Songs written by Benjamin Burnley